Franklin Rosemont (1943–2009) was an American poet, artist, historian, street speaker, and co-founder of the Chicago Surrealist Group. Over four decades, Franklin produced a body of work, of declarations, manifestos, poetry, collage, hidden histories, and other interventions.

Early life 

He was born in Chicago, Illinois, to Henry, a typographer and labor activist, and Sally, a jazz musician. In 1960, he dropped out of Proviso East High School, Maywood, Illinois, but was admitted to  Roosevelt University in Chicago in 1962, studying under African-American scholar St. Clair Drake.

Career 

A self-identified anarchist, Rosemont edited the 1960s anarchist publication Rebel Worker. He edited and wrote an introduction for What is Surrealism?: Selected Writings of André Breton, and edited Arsenal/Surrealist Subversion, The Rise & Fall of the DIL Pickle: Jazz-Age Chicago's Wildest & Most Outrageously Creative Hobohemian Nightspot and Juice Is Stranger Than Friction: Selected Writings of T-Bone Slim. With his wife Penelope Rosemont, herself the author and editor of several books and active in the Chicago Surrealists, and poet and storyteller Paul Garon, he edited The Forecast is Hot!. His work has been deeply concerned with both the history of surrealism (writing a forward for Max Ernst and Alchemy: A Magician in Search of Myth) and of the radical labor movement in America, for instance, writing a biography of Joe Hill. According to PoetrySoup.com Franklin Rosemont "became perhaps "the most productive scholar of labor and the left in the United States." Rosemont was a member of the Industrial Workers of the World and Students for a Democratic Society. In 1964, he helped organize a strike among fellow blueberry pickers in Michigan.

Publications 
Rosemont is the author of the poetry collections The Morning of a Machine Gun: Twenty Poems & Documents. Profusely Illustrated By the Author, The Apple of the Automatic Zebra's Eye, and Penelope: A Poem, as well as An Open Entrance to the Shut Palace of Wrong Numbers, a book that explores the phenomenon of "wrong numbers" from a surrealist perspective, which was published by Black Swan Press in 2003. He also edited and introduced Hobohemia: Emma Goldman, Lucy Parsons, Ben Reitman & other agitators & outsiders in 1920s/30s Chicago, by Frank O. Beck.

In 1990 he published a collected edition of short stories by the socialist utopian author Edward Bellamy, titled Apparitions of Things to Come.  He is co-editor, with Archie Green, David Roediger, and Salvatore Salerno, of The Big Red Songbook (Chicago: Charles H. Kerr, 2007).

References

External links 

 Franklin Rosemont 1943–2009 This "cyber-tombeau" at Silliman's Blog by poet Ron Silliman includes comments, tributes, and links
 Remembering a Wobbly Surrealist an extensive tribute to Rosemont
 Franklin Rosemont, fellow worker, surrealist poet, great American comprehensive set of links to obituaries on Rosemont found around the web as of April 2009
 Franklin and Penelope Rosemont collection of IWW Publications at Newberry Library
Franklin W. Rosement Papers at the Newberry Library
 

1943 births
2009 deaths
Writers from Chicago
American male poets
Surrealist poets
Burials at Forest Home Cemetery, Chicago
Industrial Workers of the World members
American surrealist writers
American surrealist artists
20th-century American poets
American Book Award winners
20th-century American male writers
American anarchists